Sophia's Dairy is a historic home in Aberdeen, Harford County, Maryland, United States. It is a large center-hall brick house, with a low stone wing, built in 1768 in the Georgian style.  The interior features a double stair which extends upward on the west wall from both ends of the hall. It continues east in one short flight, then separates and parallels the lower flight to the second story hall.

Sophia's Dairy was listed on the National Register of Historic Places in 1973.

References

External links
, including photo from 1973, at Maryland Historical Trust

Houses completed in 1768
Houses in Harford County, Maryland
Houses on the National Register of Historic Places in Maryland
Georgian architecture in Maryland
Historic American Buildings Survey in Maryland
Aberdeen, Maryland
National Register of Historic Places in Harford County, Maryland
1768 establishments in Maryland